Sulley Mohammed is a Ghanaian professional footballer who currently plays for King Faisal F.C. in the Ghana Premier League.

Career
Sulley Mohammed has played for several Ghanaian teams and is currently playing with King Faisal F.C. as a forward.

International career
In November 2013, coach Maxwell Konadu invited him to be a part of the Ghana squad for the 2013 WAFU Nations Cup. He helped the team to a first-place finish after Ghana beat Senegal by three goals to one.

References

Living people
Ghanaian footballers
WAFU Nations Cup players
Association football forwards
Year of birth missing (living people)
Ghana A' international footballers
2014 African Nations Championship players